Zane Township is one of the seventeen townships of Logan County, Ohio, United States. As of the 2010 census, the population was 1,140, up from 968 at the 2000 census.

Geography
Located in the southeastern corner of the county, it borders the following townships:
Perry Township - north
Liberty Township, Union County - northeast
Allen Township, Union County - east
Rush Township, Champaign County - southeast
Wayne Township, Champaign County - southwest
Monroe Township - west
Jefferson Township - northwest corner

No municipalities are located in Zane Township, although the unincorporated community of Middleburg lies in the township's northwest.

Name and history
Zane Township was organized in 1818, and was named for Isaac Zane, a pioneer settler. It is the only Zane Township statewide.

Government
The township is governed by a three-member board of trustees, who are elected in November of odd-numbered years to a four-year term beginning on the following January 1. Two are elected in the year after the presidential election and one is elected in the year before it. There is also an elected township fiscal officer, who serves a four-year term beginning on April 1 of the year after the election, which is held in November of the year before the presidential election. Vacancies in the fiscal officership or on the board of trustees are filled by the remaining trustees.

In the elections of November 2007, Jack Graham and Terri Bennett were elected without opposition to the positions of township trustee and township fiscal officer respectively.

Transportation
Important highways in Zane Township include U.S. Route 33 and State Routes 287 and 559.

References

External links

County website
County and township map of Ohio
Detailed Logan County map
Local history and genealogical information on several early Middleburg families

Townships in Logan County, Ohio
Townships in Ohio
1806 establishments in Ohio
Populated places established in 1806